The European Retail Round Table is a European organisation which represents companies from the European retail sector. Together the members employ about 2.3 million people and have a turnover of €400 billion.

The organisation is based in Brussels, Belgium.

Members
The organization's members, as of January 2017, are:

Timber Retail Coalition
In April 2010 the Timber Retail Coalition was created to tackling global deforestation by illegally harvested timber.
The four members of this coalition are:

References

Trade associations based in Belgium
Retail trade associations